Aquatics at the 1993 Southeast Asian Games included swimming, diving and water polo events. The three sports of aquatics were held at Toa Payoh Aquatics Center in Singapore. Aquatics events was held between 13 Juni to 17 June.

Medal winners

Swimming
Men's events

Women's events

Diving

Water polo

1993 Southeast Asian Games
1993